"Armchair general" is a derogatory term for a person who regards themselves as an expert on military matters, despite having little to no actual experience in the military. Alternatively, it can mean a military commander who does not participate in actual combat.

Conventional usage 
The most common usage of the term refers to "[a] person without military experience who regards himself as an expert military strategist."

This person may be a civilian whose only exposure to the military or military history is through academic or self-study, or a former member of the military, who was of low rank and/or has no experience with planning or strategic decision-making.  In both cases, these individuals claim to be more capable of analyzing combat conditions and making strategic judgments than past military commanders who have been responsible for such analysis and decisions (see also Armchair theorizing).

 Examples of usage 
In 1967, The New York Times correspondent Max Frankel wrote, "In most wars, the armchairs are full of generals re-fighting every battle."
The term is sometimes used as a self-referential joke by strategy gamers playing history-based military board or role-playing games.

 Other examples 
Adolf Hitler was an enlisted soldier during World War I. Later, as Führer'', he assumed direct operational command of the German military during World War II, often overruling his general staff's recommendations. He did this based on the assertion that his experience as a "front-line fighter" made him better qualified to make strategic decisions than them, in spite of never having held an officer's rank, or any strategic planning experience.

Alternate usage 
The term is also used to describe "a military commander who is not actively involved in warfare, or who directs troops from a position of comfort or safety." These officers' duties are described by the media and the rest of the military as more bureaucratic than functional, and who have little to no experience in combat or warfare, yet hold a great degree of authority over soldiers or commanders who do.

The term is not exclusively applied to officers of command rank (such as generals or Admirals); it is also a popular term among enlisted personnel and the media to describe high-ranking officers whose rank affords them superior privileges, especially when they have attained rank through higher education, or the influence of their families, rather than combat duty.

Origin 
Carl von Clausewitz alluded to "someone following operations from an armchair".

Armchair admiral 
The variant "armchair admiral" has the added implication that operations at sea such as battle (or in peacetime, rescue), bring in several constraints and complications (like the danger of drowning) that are poorly taken into account by people not familiar with seafaring.

Examples 

 Many of the generals of World War I had experience in combat, but only from the days before trench warfare became widespread. Because of this, officers lacked the experience that in the past had made it viable to command troops from a distance.
Dwight D. Eisenhower, after enlisting in the U.S. Army in 1911, was assigned to the Army War College and graduated in 1928. He never served in combat, even during World War I, and held mostly administrative positions afterwards. During World War II, he was appointed Supreme Commander of the Allied Expeditionary Force, in spite of never having been in combat.
George Marshall was described as the "organizer of victory" by Winston Churchill, for his outstanding logistical and administrative skills. Like Eisenhower, he rose to general's rank despite having never led troops in combat.

See also 
Armchair warrior
Armchair revolutionary
Backseat driver
Dilettante
Hindsight bias
Pogue/REMF
Umarell

References 

Military terminology